Paquita Salas is a Spanish comedy streaming television series created by Javier Calvo and Javier Ambrossi. It first premiered on the web platform Flooxer in July 2016. After unexpected success, the series eventually aired on television channel Neox. Netflix acquired the series in October 2017 and renewed the show for second and third seasons. The second season premiered on June 29, 2018.
In May 2018, a third season was scheduled for 2020, but surprisingly Netflix announced that the third season would arrive in 2019. The third season premiered on June 28, 2019. A fourth season was confirmed for the future.

Synopsis 

Paquita Salas is a talent agent who used to be at the top of her industry in the 90s. But times have changed and she hasn't. Now her agency, PS Management, is struggling to find new clients and keep the ones it already has. When her most famous client dumps her, Paquita's world comes crashing down. Alongside her faithful secretary Magüi, Paquita is forced to reinvent herself while searching for new talent.

Cast 
 Brays Efe as Paquita Salas
 Belén Cuesta as Magüi Moreno
 Lidia San José as herself
 Mariona Terés as herself (main season 1–2)
 Álex de Lucas as himself (main season 1–2, recurring season 3)
 Anna Castillo as Belén de Lucas (main season 2–present, guest season 1)
 Yolanda Ramos as Noemí Argüelles (main season 2–presente, guest season 1)
 Belinda Washington as herself (main season 3–present, guest season 1–2)
 Terelu Campos as Bárbara Valiente (main season 3–present, guest season 2)

Series overview

Episodes

Season 1 (2016)

Season 2 (2018)

Season 3 (2019)

External links 
 
 Netflix
 Twitter

References 

2016 Spanish television series debuts
Mockumentary television series
Spanish-language Netflix original programming
Television series about actors
Television shows set in Madrid
2010s Spanish comedy television series